Andrew Render Stahl (born April 8, 1952) is an American actor, best known for appearing as Tom McHone in the Christy series and General Armand Stassi in seaQuest 2032.

Life and career

Stahl was born in San Antonio, Texas in 1952. As a child, Stahl moved around a lot due to his father's work as an airline pilot. When he was nine, he moved with his parents to a farm in Butler County, Kentucky, which he still owns and operates today. He graduated from University High School in Bowling Green, Kentucky in 1970 and Western Kentucky University (WKU) in 1975. At WKU, Stahl served as one of the section editors of WKU's yearbook, The Talisman. He was a member of Sigma Nu fraternity, Eta Rho Chapter. 

Early in his career, he spent time as a musician and visual artist before taking up acting in local regional theater. He spent a short period of time in New York City in the early 1980s, where he studied with Wynn Handman, William Hickey and Jack Waltzer, and performed in various Off Broadway productions. He currently lives on his family farm in Butler County, Kentucky and works out of Atlanta, Georgia and Nashville, Tennessee. He has one son.

Stahl has appeared as the host of a cable educational series created by the Kentucky Blues Society to spotlight Kentucky blues artists.

Filmography

Rearview Mirror (TV) (1984) .... Henry Davenport
The River (1984) .... Dave Birkin
Invasion U.S.A. (1985) .... Christmas Father
North and South (mini series) (1985) .... Cadet Ned Fisk
North and South, Book II (mini-series) (1986) .... Major Ned Fisk
The Last Days of Frank and Jesse James (1986) .... Dick Liddil
Mayflower Madam (TV) (1987) .... Stuart
Unconquered (TV) (1989) .... Father Dante
Ernest Goes to Jail (1990) .... Jerry
Mr. Destiny (1990) .... Jerry Haskins
The Real McCoy (1993) .... Mr. Kroll
The Client (1994) .... FBI Agent Scherff
Follow the River (1995) .... Henry Lenard
Christy (TV) (1994–1995) .... Tom McHone
SeaQuest 2032 (1995) .... General Armand Stassi
Tom and Huck (1995) .... Sheriff
Andersonville (TV) (1996) .... Jury Foreman
Our Son, the Matchmaker (TV) (1996) .... Walter Longwell
A Time to Kill (1996) .... Reluctant Male Juror
The People vs. Larry Flynt (1996) .... Network Lawyer
What the Deaf Man Heard (TV) (1997) .... Finis
October Sky (1999) .... Jack Palmer
The Patriot (2000) .... General Nathanel Greene
Christy: Return to Cutter Gap (TV) (2000) .... Tom McHone
Christy, Choices of the Heart, Part I: A Change of Seasons (mini-series) (2001) .... Tom McHone
Christy, Choices of the Heart, Part II: A New Beginning (mini-series) (2001) .... Tom McHone
Rustin (2001) .... Mr. Gatlin
Furnace (2006) .... Warden Patt
Glory Road (2006) .... Dr. Ray
Big Momma's House 2 (2006) .... Principal
Supernatural (TV) (The Usual Suspects) (2006) .... Jeff Krause
Fantastic Four: Rise of the Silver Surfer (2007) .... Tailor
The Mist (2007) .... Mike Hatlen
The L Word (TV) ("Lay Down the Law") (2008) .... Ranking Member
The Blind Side (2009).... Principal Sandstrom
State of Emergency (2013) .... Pivens
Reckless (2013) TV film
Table 19 (2017) .... Henry Grotsky

Stahl also appeared in "The Journey of August King". On television Stahl appeared on "Matlock", "In the Heat of the Night", and "SeaQuest DSV".

References

External links

1952 births
Living people
American male film actors
American male television actors
Male actors from San Antonio
Western Kentucky University alumni